Park Jae-hyung (born September 15, 1992), better known as Jae, is an Argentine-born American musician, singer, and songwriter of Korean descent, best known as a former vocalist and lead guitarist of South Korean rock band Day6. Prior to joining Day6, he gained attention in South Korea as one of the final six contestants in the first season of the singing competition television series K-pop Star. In 2020, Park began releasing solo music under the name eaJ.

Early life 
Jae Park was born in Buenos Aires, Argentina and moved to Cerritos, California in early childhood. He graduated from Cerritos High School and later studied political science at California State University, Long Beach. Throughout high school and university, he ran a YouTube channel, "YellowPostItMan", where he uploaded vocal-and-guitar song covers as a hobby.

In 2012, Park took a leave from university to compete as a singer-guitarist in the inaugural season of K-pop Star. Though he was eliminated from the competition in sixth place, JYP Entertainment (JYPE) offered Park a contract at the end of the show to join the company as a trainee for an upcoming band. Park accepted the offer and moved to South Korea.

Career

Debut with Day6 and first solo activities (2015–2021) 

Park debuted on September 7, 2015, as a vocalist and electric guitarist of JYP's first rock band, Day6. The band debuted with EP The Day.

On June 28, 2016, he became an MC of Arirang's After School Club, alongside Park Ji-min and Kevin Woo, formerly of U-KISS. He officially graduated as ASC's MC on July 17, 2018. He began a personal music project on YouTube in 2020, releasing self-written solo tracks under the name eaJ.

On February 5, 2020, Park started his first podcast "How Did I Get Here?" (HDIGH) with Dive Studios. With episodes releasing every Tuesday, it quickly gained a sizeable audience. HDIGH Podcast won "People's Choice" and "Entertainment" Category by Podcast Award in 2020 and Best Podcast 2020 by Apple Podcast. The last episode was released in June 2021.

On September 21, 2020, Park, alongside 2PM's Nichkhun, took on roles as members of crime-fighting boyband "4 2 Sing" in season three of Big Hero 6: The Series. Park played twins Kwang-Sun and Ye Joon, one half of the boy band "4 2 Sing".

On November 27, 2020, DPR Live collaborated with Crush and Park for “Jam & Butterfly”.

On September 16, 2020, Park announced his first collab with Seori for "It just is" which also featured Keshi on Guitar. On 22 August 2021 they returned with their latest collaboration "Dive with You"  both of their song featured visual artist Deisa.

In December 2020, Park and Keshi released a single on YouTube, "Pillow".

Park performed at Head in the Clouds Festival 2021 on November 6–7, 2021 at the Brookside at the Rose Bowl in Pasadena, California.

Departure from Day6 and continuation of solo career (2021–present) 

On December 31, 2021, Park announced via Twitter that he will be taking a hiatus from his promotions as a member of the band. The same day, JYP Entertainment announced that he will be leaving the band and ending his exclusive contract with the company due to personal reasons.

On April 8, Park released a single titled "Car Crash" on streaming platforms, working with 100 Thieves and John Lee for its music video.

On May 25, Park released his second "Mindset Collection" through the platform Dive Studios.

Park performed at Head in the Clouds Festival 2022 on August 20–21, 2022 at Brookside at the Rose Bowl in Pasadena, California.

On October 28, Park performed as a guest artist at the MAX - North America Tour 2022 show at The Wiltern in Los Angeles, California. 

For the first time in his solo career, Park performed at Head in the Clouds Festival 2022 on December 3-4, 2022 at Community Park PIK2 in Jakarta, Indonesia as a headliner artist. 

In December 2022, Park embarked on his first Asia Tour with 2 shows: one at Clapper Studio in Taipei, Taiwan on December 6, 2022 and another at Gateway Theatre in Singapore on December 8, 2022.  
On December 8 2022, Park released a single titled "Typical Story" on streaming platforms

Park performed as a headliner artist at Head in the Clouds Festival 2022 on December 9-10, 2022 at SM Festival Grounds Parañaque City in Manila, Philippines.

Personal life 
On May 10, 2020, JYP Entertainment announced that Day6 would be taking a hiatus due to the mental health concerns of some members. In an interview with Allure, Park revealed that he had a panic attack and was diagnosed with panic disorder in April 2020. Almost a week after JYP's official announcement, Park shared on his personal Twitter account an update on his condition and began sharing his experiences with mental health.

On September 15, 2020, Park initiated From Friends, a project partnered with Represent, selling clothing and other merchandise. The campaign raised $100,000 which was donated to the Jed Foundation, which helps provide free mental health resources to teenagers and young adults.

Discography

Extended plays

Singles

As lead artist

As featured artist

Notes

Filmography

Television shows

Podcasts

References

External links

Jae on JYP Publishing

1992 births
Living people
American musicians of Korean descent
Argentine emigrants to the United States
Argentine people of Korean descent
California State University, Long Beach alumni
K-pop Star participants
JYP Entertainment artists
South Korean rock guitarists
Day6 members
21st-century South Korean male singers
Twitch (service) streamers